The 2013 UEFA European Under-19 Championship was the 12th edition of the UEFA European Under-19 Championship, since its reclassification from an under-18 tournament in 2002, and the 62nd since the tournament was created in 1948. It was hosted in Lithuania from 20 July to 1 August 2013, in three cities. Only players born after 1 January 1994 were eligible to participate.

The qualification matches began in September 2012 and concluded in June 2013, with seven teams joining the Lithuanian hosts in the final tournament. Spain were the two-time defending champions, after defeating Greece in the final of the previous edition, but were eliminated by France in the semi-finals. In the final, France were beaten 1–0 by Serbia.

Bids
Eight national associations showed interest in hosting the final tournament, but only Lithuania, Germany, Hungary, and Slovenia reached the final bidding stage. On 4 October 2010, Lithuania were announced as the hosts in a meeting of the UEFA Executive Committee in Minsk, Belarus.

Venues

The final round matches were held in three stadium venues located in three Lithuanian cities:

Qualification

Qualification for the final tournament occurred in two phases: a qualifying round and an elite round. During these rounds, 51 national teams competed to determine the seven teams that would join the automatically qualified host nation, Lithuania.

The qualifying round was played between 26 September and 26 November 2012, following a draw that took place on 29 November 2011 at the UEFA headquarters in Nyon, Switzerland. According to the UEFA under-19 national team coefficient ranking, the top three teams – Spain, Serbia and Turkey – were given a bye to the elite round, whereas the remaining 48 teams were divided into two pots and drawn into 12 groups of four teams. Each group included two teams from both pots and was contested as a round-robin tournament, hosted in the country of one of the teams. The group winners and runners-up, along with the best third-placed team, qualified for the next round.

The elite round was played between 22 May and 11 June 2012 and was contested by the 25 teams advancing from the qualifying round plus the three teams which received byes. The draw took place on 5 December 2012 at the UEFA headquarters and allocated the 28 teams – previously arranged into four seeding pots according to their qualifying round coefficient (teams with bye were automatically seeded in the first pot) – into seven groups of four. Each group was contested similarly to the qualifying round, with the seven group winners securing qualification for the final tournament.

Qualified teams
The following eight teams qualified for the final tournament:

1 Bold indicates champion for that year. Italic indicates host for that year.
2 As Serbia and Montenegro

Match officials
UEFA named six referees and eight assistant referees to officiate matches at the final tournament. Additionally, two referees from the host nation were chosen as fourth officials.

Referees
  Aleksei Kulbakov (Belarus)
  Emir Alečković (Bosnia and Herzegovina)
  Michael Oliver (England)
  Felix Zwayer (Germany)
  Orel Grinfeld (Israel)
  Martin Strömbergsson (Sweden)

Assistant referees
  Mubariz Hashimov (Azerbaijan)
  Dermot Broughton (Ireland)
  Stelios Nikita (Cyprus)
  Derya Oguz (Denmark)
  Michael Karsiotis (Greece)
  Mitchell Scerri (Malta)
  Nikola Razić (Montenegro)
  Leif Erik Opland (Norway)

Fourth officials
  Gediminas Mažeika (Lithuania)
  Sergejus Slyva (Lithuania)

Squads

Group stage

The draw for the group stage was held on 14 June 2013 in Kaunas, at the Town Hall, and was conducted by the UEFA Youth and Amateur Football Committee chairman, Jim Boyce, who was assisted by final tournament ambassadors Vaida Česnauskienė and Marius Stankevičius. The eight finalists were drawn into two groups of four teams and played matches against each other in a round-robin system. The top two teams from each group advanced to the semi-finals.

If two or more teams are equal on points on completion of the group matches, the following tie-breaking criteria are applied:
 Higher number of points obtained in the matches played between the teams in question;
 Superior goal difference resulting from the matches played between the teams in question;
 Higher number of goals scored in the matches played between the teams in question;
 If two teams are still tied after criteria 1–3 have been applied, the criteria are reapplied on those teams. If the tie is not broken, criteria 5–8 are applied;
 Superior goal difference in all group matches;
 Higher number of goals scored in all group matches;
 Fair play conduct of the teams (final tournament);
 Drawing of lots.

If two teams are tied after having met in the last round of the group stage, their final ranking is determined instead by a penalty shoot-out. This method is only valid when determining which team qualifies for the next round or for another competition.

All times are in Eastern European Summer Time (UTC+03:00).

Group A

Group B

Knockout stage

Bracket

Semifinals

Final

Goalscorers
3 goals

 Anass Achahbar
 Gratas Sirgėdas
 Alexandre Guedes

2 goals

 Yassine Benzia
 Adrien Hunou
 Rai Vloet
 Andrija Luković
 Iker Hernández
 Sandro Ramírez
 Okan Deniz
 Recep Niyaz

1 goal

 Antoine Conte
 Avto Endeladze
 Nika Kacharava
 Lukas Artimavičius
 Mimoun Mahi
 Tobias Figueiredo
 Ricardo Horta
 Rony Lopes
 Carlos Mané
 Bernardo Silva
 Leandro Silva
 Uroš Đurđević
 Mijat Gaćinović
 Dejan Meleg
 Aleksandar Mitrović
 Marko Pavlovski
 José Rodríguez
 Álvaro Vadillo
 Fede Vico
 Enver Cenk Şahin
 İbrahim Yılmaz

Own goals
 Džiugas Petrauskas (against Portugal)

Awards
Golden Player:  Aleksandar Mitrović
Golden Boot:  Gratas Sirgėdas, Anass Achahbar, Alexandre Guedes

Team of the Tournament
After the final, the UEFA technical team selected 23 players to integrate the "team of the tournament".

Goalkeepers
  Bacho Mikava
  Predrag Rajković
  Alfonso Herrero

Defenders
  Antoine Conte
  Aymeric Laporte
  Tobias Figueiredo
  Rafa
  Miloš Veljković
  Héctor Bellerín
  Borja López

Midfielders
  Anthony Martial
  Adrien Rabiot
  Bilal Başaçıkoğlu
  Rai Vloet
  Bernardo Silva
  Marko Pavlovski
  José Rodríguez
  Álvaro Vadillo
  Recep Niyaz

Forwards
  Yassine Benzia
  Gratas Sirgėdas
  Hélder Costa
  Aleksandar Mitrović

Notes

References

External links

UEFA.com

 
UEFA European Under-19 Championship
2013
UEFA European Under-19 Championship
2013 UEFA European Under-19 Championship
July 2013 sports events in Europe
August 2013 sports events in Europe
2013 in youth association football